The Embassy of Romania in Chișinău is the diplomatic mission of Romania to Moldova. The embassy is located in Central Chișinău, at 66/1 București Street.

History 

Romania was the first state to recognize the independence of Moldova on 27 August 1991. The Romanian embassy was the first diplomatic mission in Chișinău and was opened on 20 January 1992.

Filip Teodorescu (born 26 December 1951) was appointed as the Romanian ambassador to Chișinău in March 2003 and arrived at post in April 2003. After postelectoral violences from 7 April 2009, Moldovan President Vladimir Voronin announced that Romanian ambassador in Chișinău Filip Teodorescu was declared persona non grata and had 24 hours to leave the Moldovan territory. The following day, the Romanian parliament nominated a senior diplomat, Mihnea Constantinescu, as the new ambassador to Moldova, but two weeks later, the Moldovan government rejected him without any explanation, deepening the crisis.

Romania's Consul to Chișinău, Ion Nuică, forwarded his resignation on 13 July 2009, after a tape in which he was surprised in intimate scenes with a woman, supposedly employee at the Romanian Consulate in Chișinău.

On 9 February 2010 the Romanian Parliament approved a new ambassador to Moldova. The new ambassador Marius Lazurcă (b. 1971, Timișoara) has a PhD in history-anthropology from Paris-Sorbonne University and was ambassador to Holy See.

Ambassadors

See also
Romanian diplomatic missions
Moldovan–Romanian relations

References

External links 
Official site

Romania
Chisinau
Moldova–Romania relations
Buildings and structures in Chișinău